Cudonigera is a genus of moths of the family Tortricidae and the tribe Archipini.

Species
Cudonigera houstonana (Grote, 1873)

See also
List of Tortricidae genera

References

 , 1977, in Powell & Obraztsov, Journal of the Lepidopterists' Society 31: 119. 
 , 2005, World Catalogue of Insects 5.

External links
tortricidae.com

Archipini
Tortricidae genera